Dysschema fenestrata is a moth of the family Erebidae. It was described by Francis Walker in 1855. It is found in Mexico.

References

Dysschema
Moths described in 1855